Deepasthambham Mahascharyam is a 1999 Malayalam film directed by K. B. Madhu and starring Dileep as an Ottamthullal dancer who is caught in a love triangle with two girls.

Plot
Mundoor Ramanandan Nambiar is an Ottamthullal dancer who is struggling to make a living. Once he was hired by a rich man to perform at a week-long function. His daughter Priya (Sangeetha) falls in love with him but she understands that Mundoor is already in love with Indu (Jomol).

Cast

 Dileep as Mundoor Ramanandan Nambeesan
 Jomol as Indu Nambiar
 Sangeetha as Priya
 Jagathy Sreekumar as Nalpamaram Nambeeshan Ramandan's father
 Harisree Asokan as Aliyar
 Rajan P. Dev as Nambiar
 Oduvil Unnikrishnan as Govinda Varma Raja
 Salu Kuttanadu as Sugreevan
 Kaviyoor Renuka as Madhavi
 Jagadish as Susheelan
 C. I. Paul as Madhavan
 Madhupal as Dinesh
 Mamukkoya as Saithali

Reception and box office
The film received mixed to positive and negative reviews from critics and audiences all over Kerala. The film was not commercially successful. The songs however were hits.

Soundtrack
The songs were composed by Mohan Sithara, with lyrics by Yusuf Ali Kechery.

Awards

 Asianet Film Award for Best Lyricist - Yusuf Ali Kechery

References

External links
 

1990s Malayalam-language films
1999 films
1999 romantic comedy films
Indian romantic comedy films
Films scored by Mohan Sithara